Corallodiscus is a genus of flowering plants belonging to the family Gesneriaceae.

Its native range is Himalaya to China.

Species:

Corallodiscus bhutanicus 
Corallodiscus conchifolius 
Corallodiscus cooperi 
Corallodiscus grandis 
Corallodiscus kingianus 
Corallodiscus lanuginosus

References

Didymocarpoideae
Gesneriaceae genera